Elections to Stockport Metropolitan Borough Council were held on 6 May 2010. One third of the seats were up for election.

The current state of the parties after the election is:

Given the election results, the Council administration continued to be run by a Liberal Democrat-majority, as it had continuously since 2002.

Results

Bramhall North

Bramhall South

Bredbury and Woodley

Bredbury Green and Romiley

Brinnington and Central

Cheadle and Gatley

Cheadle Hulme North

Cheadle Hulme South

Davenport and Cale Green

Edgeley and Cheadle Heath

Hazel Grove

Heald Green

Heatons North

Heatons South

Manor

Marple North

Marple South

Offerton

Reddish North

Reddish South

Stepping Hill

References

External links
Stockport Council - Elections 2010

Stockport Metropolitan Borough Council election
Stockport Metropolitan Borough Council election
2010
2010s in Greater Manchester